Prince William of Schaumburg-Lippe (12 December 18344 April 1906) was son of George William, Prince of Schaumburg-Lippe and member of the House of Lippe.

Early life
William was born at Bückeburg, Schaumburg-Lippe, seventh child and third son of George William, Prince of Schaumburg-Lippe (1784–1860), (son of Philip II, Count of Schaumburg-Lippe and Landgravine Juliane of Hesse-Philippsthal) and his wife, Princess Ida of Waldeck and Pyrmont (1796–1869), (daughter of George I, Prince of Waldeck and Pyrmont and Princess Augusta of Schwarzburg-Sondershausen).

Marriage
William married 30 May 1862 at Dessau to Princess Bathildis of Anhalt-Dessau (1837–1902), daughter of Prince Frederick Augustus of Anhalt-Dessau, and his wife, Princess Marie Luise Charlotte of Hesse-Kassel.

They had eight children:
Princess Charlotte of Schaumburg-Lippe (10 October 1864 – 16 July 1946), married in 1886 to William II of Württemberg, no issue.
Prince Franz Joseph of Schaumburg-Lippe (8 October 1865 – 4 September 1881)
Prince Frederick of Schaumburg-Lippe (30 January 1868 – 12 December 1945), married in 1896 to Princess Louise of Denmark, had issue.
Prince Albrecht of Schaumburg-Lippe (24 October 1869 – 25 December 1942), married in 1897 to Duchess Elsa of Württemberg, had issue.
Prince Maximilian of Schaumburg-Lippe (13 March 1871 – 1 April 1904), married in 1898 to Duchess Olga of Württemberg, had issue.
Princess Bathildis of Schaumburg-Lippe (21 May 1873 – 6 April 1962), married in 1895 to Friedrich, Prince of Waldeck and Pyrmont, had issue.
Princess Adelaide of Schaumburg-Lippe (22 September 1875 – 27 January 1971), married in 1898 to Ernst II, Duke of Saxe-Altenburg, had issue, divorced in 1920.
Princess Alexandra Karoline of Schaumburg-Lippe (9 June 1879 – 5 January 1949), scheduled to marry King Alexander I of Serbia, but against the wishes of his parents, he married instead his mother's lady in waiting, Draga Mašin.

He and his daughter-in-law Princess Louise of Denmark died five hours apart at the family castle in Nachod, Bohemia.

Honours
  Ascanian duchies: Grand Cross of the House Order of Albert the Bear, 14 January 1856
 : Knight of the Order of the Gold Lion of the House of Nassau, July 1864
  Mecklenburg: Grand Cross of the House Order of the Wendish Crown, with Crown in Ore, 21 March 1868
   Austria-Hungary:
 Knight of the Imperial Order of the Iron Crown, 1st Class, 1875
 Grand Cross of the Austrian Imperial Order of Leopold, 1899
    Ernestine duchies: Grand Cross of the Saxe-Ernestine House Order, 1882
 :
 Knight of the House Order of Fidelity, 1885
 Knight of the Order of Berthold the First, 1885
 : Grand Cross of the Order of the Württemberg Crown, 1886

Ancestry

References

Notes and sources
L'Allemagne dynastique, Huberty, Giraud, Magdelaine, Reference: II 269

1834 births
1906 deaths
People from Bückeburg
People from Schaumburg-Lippe
William
William
Members of the House of Lords (Austria)
Austrian generals
Sons of monarchs